The 1976 Pacific Southwest Open, also known under its sponsorship name 1976 Arco–Pacific Southwest Open, was a men's tennis tournament played on indoor carpet courts at the Pauley Pavilion in Los Angeles, California in the United States. The event was part of the Grand Prix tennis circuit and categorized as four-star. It was the 50th edition of the tournament and ran from September 20 through September 27, 1976. Tenth-seeded Brian Gottfried won the singles title and $20,000 first-prize money.

Finals

Singles
 Brian Gottfried defeated  Arthur Ashe 6–2, 6–2 
 It was Gottfried's 1st singles title of the year and the 7th of his career.

Doubles
 Bob Lutz /  Stan Smith defeated  Arthur Ashe /  Charlie Pasarell 6–4, 3–6, 6–4

References

External links
 Official website
 ITF tournament edition details

Los Angeles Open (tennis)
Pacific Southwest Open
Pacific Southwest Open
Pacific Southwest Open
Pacific Southwest Open